Bardzinek  is a village in the administrative district of Gmina Krośniewice, within Kutno County, Łódź Voivodeship, in central Poland. A nest village of the Bardziński noble family.

References

Bardzinek